Praise is the act of expressing approval or thanks.

Praise may also refer to:

 Elkhorn City, Kentucky, long known as Praise
 Praise (film), a 1998 Australian film
 Praise (novel), a novel by Andrew McGahan

Music
 Praise music
 Praise (band), an English new-age music group
 Praise (album), a 2017 album by Emcee N.I.C.E.
 Praise with Don Moen, a 1996 album
 "Praise" (Sevendust song), 2001
 "Praise" (Marvin Gaye song), 1981

Radio stations 
 Praise FM (disambiguation), branding for several unaffiliated radio stations
 WJMO, an American radio station branded as Praise 1300
 Praise (Sirius XM), a gospel music radio station

See also 
 
 Praise and worship (disambiguation)
 Cathedral of Praise, in Manilia, Philippines